The 2017–18 Liga Iberdrola was the 81st season of the Liga Iberdrola, Spain's premier field hockey league for women. It began on 23 September 2017 and it concluded with the championship final on 3 June 2018.

Club de Campo were the defending champions.

Teams
A total of 10 teams participated in the 2018–2019 edition of the Liga Iberdrola. The promoted team was UD Taburiente, who replaced CH Pozuelo.

Results

Regular season

Table

Fixtures

Play–offs

Quarter-finals

|}

Club de Campo won the series 2–0.

Real Club de Polo won the series 1–0.

Real Sociedad won the series 5–4 on aggregate, after the series finished 1–1.

Júnior won the series 1–0.

Semi-finals

Final

Top goalscorers

References

External links
Official website

División de Honor Femenina de Hockey Hierba
Spain
field hockey
field hockey